Georges Heylens (born 8 August 1941 in Etterbeek) is a Belgian former footballer. He played with R.S.C. Anderlecht and the Belgium national football team. He took part in the match between Belgium and the Netherlands in 1964, with 10 teammates from the Anderlecht team, after the substitution of goalkeeper Delhasse by Jean-Marie Trappeniers. As an attacking right-back played in all three games at the Mexico World Cup at which time he reached his 50th International appearance.

He now appears as a football consultant in papers or on TV.  Heylens is also a famous wig bearer.

Honours

Player 
RSC Anderlecht

 Belgian First Division: 1961–62, 1963–64, 1964–65, 1965–66, 1966–67, 1967–68, 1971–72
 Belgian Cup: 1964–65, 1971–72, 1972–73
 Belgian League Cup: 1973
 Inter-Cities Fairs Cup runners-up: 1969–70

International 

 UEFA Euro 1972: Third place

Manager 
Individual

 Belgian Professional Manager of the Year: 1983–1984

External links
 
 
 

1941 births
1970 FIFA World Cup players
Belgian Pro League players
Belgian footballers
Belgium international footballers
Living people
R.S.C. Anderlecht players
UEFA Euro 1972 players
Belgian football managers
Royale Union Saint-Gilloise managers
K.V. Kortrijk managers
Lille OSC managers
Gençlerbirliği S.K. managers
R. Charleroi S.C. managers
K.V. Mechelen managers
S.C. Eendracht Aalst managers
Association football defenders
AS FAR (football) managers